Kondurg is a Mandal in Ranga Reddy district, Telangana.

Geography
It has an average elevation of 639 metres (2099 ft).

Demographics
According to Indian census, 2001, the demographic details of Kondurg mandal is as follows:
 Total Population: 	54,899	in 10,739 Households. 
 Male Population: 	27,793	and Female Population: 	27,106		
 Children Under 6-years of age: 8,888	(Boys -	4,578 and Girls -	4,310)
 Total Literates: 	19,261

Kondurg village has a population of 1,925 (East) and 4,251 (West) in 2001.

Panchayats
There are 28 Gram panchayats in the Mandal.
 Agiryal 	
 Chegireddi Ghanapuram 
 Cherukupalle 	
 Chinna Elikicherla 	
 Edira 
 Galigudem 
 Gunjalpad 
 Gurrampalle 	
 Indranagar 
 Jakaram 
 Jilled 
 Kondurg(West) 
 Mahadevpoor 
 Mutpoor 
 Padmaram 
 Parvathpur 	
 Pedda Elikicherla 
 Raviryal 
 Regadi Chilakamarri 
 Srirangapur 
 Tangellapalle 
 Tekulapalle 
 Thoompalle 
 Tummalapalle
 Ummethyal Lalapet
 Uttraspally
 Veerannapet
 Venkiryal
 Viswanathpur

References

External links
 Map of Kondurg in Google maps.
 Kondurg Mandal in Telugu

Mandals in Ranga Reddy district